Pilgrimage is a 2017 Irish medieval film directed by Brendan Muldowney, and starring Tom Holland, Richard Armitage and Jon Bernthal. It premiered at the Tribeca Film Festival in April 2017.

Plot

In 55 A.D. Cappadocia, Saint Matthias is dragged in chains by a group of men to be stoned to death. Before the final stone is thrown, lightning begins to crackle overhead.

In 1209 A.D. Medieval Ireland, French Cistercian monk Frère Geraldus arrives at a remote monastery with a charter from Pope Innocent III, commanding the monks to undertake a pilgrimage to transport their holiest relic to Rome. The monks reluctantly agree as legend tells that the relic's holy power will destroy any not pure-hearted enough to possess it. A handful of monks set out, including multilingual Brother Ciarán and novice Brother Diarmuid, accompanied by a mute laborer. As the group is caught in a rainstorm, the golden reliquary is struck by lightning but shows no damage, further reinforcing the notion of its mystical power.

Ireland, at the time reeling under successive Norman invasions, is a dangerous place; in fear of Gaelic Irish warriors, Geraldus leads several monks to a Norman encampment led by Baron de Merville, who believes that assisting the pilgrims will enable his forgiveness for atrocities committed as a crusader in service of the Church. The monks are disgusted by the violent nature of the soldiers, especially the Baron's son Raymond de Merville, despite Geraldus' claim of their protection being a necessary evil. It is revealed that the reliquary contains not the remains of the apostle Matthias, but rather the stone used to martyr him and that the Pope believes its tremendous power will benefit an upcoming crusade.

A larger caravan of armed men, led by Raymond, sets out escorting the monks to the boat that awaits them in Waterford. Raymond, speaking French, tells the mute laborer that some of his men recognize him as a former crusader but not from where; only Brother Ciarán speaks French, and the rest of the monks are left in the dark. En route, the caravan finds that a necessary bridge has been burned and its guards slaughtered, and Raymond takes most of the soldiers with him to give chase, leaving the monks with a token guard.

The monks continue, but are quickly ambushed by a group of Gaelic warriors, who slaughtered the soldiers and several monks. The Mute dives to protect the young Diarmuid, but is stunned by a rock from a sling. As the Gaels make off with the cart bearing the reliquary, the Mute regains consciousness, grabs a sword from a fallen soldier, and kills several of the Gaels, including their chieftain; the rest scatter in fear. The two surviving monks, Diarmuid and the timid Cathal, are astonished until Geraldus claims the Mute's fierce actions as holy wrath on the Gaels for desecrating the reliquary. They choose to follow after the stolen relic, as it is too dangerous to wait for rescue by Raymond's troops.

The Mute tracks the stolen cart, finding the reliquary gone; he then spots a Gaelic scout and quietly kills him. They have found the Irish camp, and there are too many men to fight. To their dismay, their leader Brother Ciarán is tied hostage to a tree. Diarmuid insists they rescue Ciarán, but Geraldus insists that their holy duty is to the relic and not to their comrade; further, that Ciarán would surely also say the same. Diarmuid volunteers to after nightfall sneak into the camp and steal the relic, abandoning the ornate golden reliquary to the Gaels.

As the Mute and Diarmuid prepare to sneak into the camp, Raymond and his lieutenants appear. They are there for the relic, as they hired the Gaels to murder the pilgrims such that King John of England could claim the relic instead of the Pope. He says that John has become distrustful of his nobles in Ireland, thinking that they are more loyal to their relatives in Normandy and the King of France than himself. During their discussion Diarmuid sneaks to Ciarán's side and attempts to cut his bonds; Brother Ciarán insists the boy let him go. Ciarán, who was driving the cart bearing the reliquary during the ambush, tells Diarmuid that he threw the relic from the cart before he and the cart were taken and that Diarmuid must find the relic and leave him to his fate.

Devastated, Diarmuid leaves his mentor behind. The monks watch in horror as Raymond discovers the reliquary is empty. Raymond offers Ciarán a quick death if he tells where the relic has gone. Ciarán refuses and calls out Jesus' name as Raymond brutally kills him with a multi-pronged barb.

The monks escape and find the relic near where Brother Ciarán threw it. Geraldus fanatically insists that they continue their pilgrimage despite their desperate situation. As dawn breaks and horns sound in the distance, the group sees a fog-shrouded river. Geraldus interprets this as a divine sign, and they race to the river before Raymond and his men can find them. They ford the river, losing their pursuers until Geraldus shouts back insults at Raymond in French. Raymond replies in English, telling the group that Geraldus is such a fanatic that he sent his own father to be burned at the stake for heresy. Diarmuid pulls the relic out of his sack and prays to it. The others join him, and before long, they hear distant chiming.

The chime is the bell of a river ferry. Geraldus suggests that the Mute murder the ferrymen to enable their escape, but Brother Cathal barters with pearls he recovered from when they fell loose of the reliquary. The boat takes them almost to the coast, but as the tide is out, the estuary is too shallow to pass. Behind them, Raymond and his men cross into a clearing on the shore. The ferrymen, realizing their own danger, throw their cargo out of the boat, and all push the boat through the shallows. Geraldus, speaking French, convinces the Mute to turn around and buy the pilgrims time to escape, as God will forgive the former Crusader's sins, no matter how great. Diarmuid is crushed and tries to stop the Mute, but Geraldus holds him back as the boat begins to float.

The Mute takes on Raymond and his men alone, killing several. Raymond's archer fires at the fleeing boat, killing one of the ferrymen. Raymond engages the bare-chested and winded Mute and ultimately gains the upper hand. Raymond stabs the Mute with his barbed torture prong, asking where he comes from. The Mute responds with his only word of the film: "Hell." The Mute grabs Raymond and bites him in the throat, severing his artery, leaving him twitching on the ground. The Mute stands up, grabs his sword, and advances on the remaining three soldiers.

On the boat, Cathal reveals that he was struck with the last arrow in and slumps over. Hearing the clang of swords ashore, Geraldus tells Diarmuid that the holy relic will inspire a thousand men like the Mute to holy violence. In disgust, Diarmuid moves to throw the relic overboard. Geraldus struggles with him and goes overboard with the relic, sinking to the ocean floor.

The surviving ferryman asks Diarmuid, "Where to now?"; the novice has no answer.

Cast
 Tom Holland as Brother Diarmuid
 Richard Armitage as Raymond de Merville
 Jon Bernthal as The Mute
 John Lynch as Brother Ciarán
 Stanley Weber as Frère Geraldus
 Eric Godon as Baron de Merville
 Hugh O'Conor as Brother Cathal
 Tristan McConnell as Dugald
 Eóin Geoghegan as Crobderg
 Rúaidhrí Conroy as Brother Rua

Filming
Filming started in April 2015. Filming locations included the West Coast of Ireland and Ardennes in Belgium.

Reception
Katie Walsh of Los Angeles Times wrote, "For all its bloody and violent genre trappings, Pilgrimage [...] is a gorgeously shot film that carefully renders the details of this fascinating historical period."

References

External links
 

2017 action drama films
2010s historical films
Films about mass murder
Films about religion
Films about violence
Films set in the 13th century
Films set in the Middle Ages
Irish-language mass media
Irish historical films
Historical action films
2010s survival films
Irish-language films
English-language Irish films
English-language Belgian films
2010s English-language films